The women's 10,000 metres event at the 2015 Summer Universiade was held on 8 July at the Gwangju Universiade Main Stadium.

Medalists

Results

References

10000
2015 in women's athletics
2015